"U Mad" is a single by American rap artist Vic Mensa, featuring fellow rapper Kanye West. It was released on April 20, 2015 as a non-album single.

Background
On 9th April 2015, a recording was uploaded online of West's verse on the song. Post-release of the track, speculation had it that Mensa stole it from a French rapper.

Composition
The vocals "South, south, south side!" by featured artist West in "U Mad" were sampled from his 2015 single "All Day".

Critical reception
Rolling Stone praised the featured rapper's part of the song, writing: 'West drags out the ends of his sentences during his self-deprecating verse, making for a more mellow tone against the aggressive beat reminiscent of West's “All Day.”'.

Music video
On 9th June 2015, a music video was officially released for the track.

Commercial performance
The single only charted on the week it was released, reaching number 6 on the US Billboard Bubbling Under R&B/Hip-Hop Singles chart.

Charts

Certifications

Release history

References

External links

2015 singles
2015 songs
Kanye West songs
Vic Mensa songs
Roc Nation singles
Song recordings produced by Charlie Heat
Song recordings produced by Kanye West
Song recordings produced by Mike Dean (record producer)
Songs written by Charlie Heat
Songs written by Kanye West
Songs written by Mike Dean (record producer)